Peter Sturges Ruckman  (November 19, 1921 – April 21, 2016)  was an American Independent Fundamental Baptist pastor, author, and founder of the Pensacola Bible Institute in Pensacola, Florida (not to be confused with the Pensacola Christian College in the same city).

Ruckman was known for his position that the King James Version constituted "advanced revelation" and was the final, preserved word of God. This view is often called "Ruckmanism" by its opponents; his followers, "Ruckmanites".

Personal life
A native of Wilmington, Delaware, Ruckman was a son of Colonel  John Hamilton Ruckman (1888–1966) and a grandson of General John Wilson Ruckman (1858–1921). Ruckman was raised in Topeka, Kansas, attended Kansas State University, and earned a bachelor's degree from the University of Alabama.

Ruckman entered the U.S. Army in 1944 as a second lieutenant and volunteered to serve with the occupation forces in Japan.  While there, Ruckman studied Zen Buddhism, and spoke of "the experience of nirvana, which the Zen call samadhi, the dislocation of the spirit from the body". Ruckman returned to the United States "uneasy, unsettled, full of demons". He worked as a disc jockey and radio announcer by day and a drummer in various bands by night. After he began to hear voices, he met with a Jesuit priest to explore joining the Roman Catholic Church.  On March 14, 1949, Ruckman received Jesus Christ after talking with evangelist Hugh Pyle in the studios of WEAR radio in Pensacola. Ruckman attended Bob Jones University, where he received a master's degree and Ph.D. in religion.

Ruckman was the pastor of Bible Baptist Church in Pensacola, and his writings and recorded sermons are published by his Bible Baptist Bookstore.  Like his father, Peter Ruckman demonstrated artistic talent early in life, and he often illustrated his sermons in chalk and pastels while preaching. In 1965, Ruckman founded Pensacola Bible Institute, in part because of disagreements with other institutions with regard to Biblical translations.  Ruckman continued teaching a Sunday school class and participating in other church-related activities until April 2015, when he retired at 93.

Ruckman married three times, the first two marriages ending in divorce.  He had ten children.  His son P.S. Ruckman Jr. was a professor and authority on presidential pardons until his death in March 2018.

Philosophy and beliefs
According to David G. Burke, Ruckman was a believer in "King James Onlyism". Ruckman said that the King James Version of the Bible, the "Authorized Version" ("KJV" or "A.V."), provided "advanced revelation" beyond that discernible in the underlying Textus Receptus Greek text, believing the KJV represented the final authority in all matters of faith and practice. Ruckman believed that any edition of the Bible not based on the text of the KJV was heretical and could lead one to lose not only their "testimony [and] ministry" but even their life. 

Ruckman distinguished between the Textus Receptus of the KJV, and the numerically fewer manuscripts of the Alexandrian text-type underlying most modern New Testament versions. Ruckman characterized those who endorse the latter as members of the "Alexandrian Cult," people who believe that while the autographs were God-inspired, they have been lost, and that therefore there is "no final, absolute written authority of God anywhere on this earth". Ruckman also believed that the Septuagint was a hoax perpetrated by the "Alexandrian cult" under the leadership of the Church Father Origen Adamantius (as part of his Hexapla) in the 3rd century AD in order to subvert belief in the integrity of the Bible.

Ruckman's position on the exclusive authority of the KJV was strongly opposed by many supporters of biblical inerrancy, including signers of the Chicago Statement on Biblical Inerrancy who specifically "deny that any essential element of the Christian faith is affected by the absence of the autographs [and] further deny that this absence renders the assertion of Biblical inerrancy invalid or irrelevant".  The majority of those who support the King James Only movement reject Ruckman's position that the English KJV is superior to existing Hebrew and Greek manuscripts, and they also criticize Ruckman because "his writings are so acerbic, so offensive and mean-spirited that the entire movement has become identified with his kind of confrontational attitude".

The website of Ruckman's press notes that although some have called his writings "mean spirited", "we refer to them as 'truth with an attitude'".  According to Beacham and Bauder, "Ruckman is without any doubt the most caustic and abusive among King James-Only partisans". James R. White states in his book The King James Only Controversy that to call Ruckman "outspoken is to engage in an exercise in understatement. Caustic is too mild a term; bombastic is a little more accurate. ... There is no doubt that Peter S. Ruckman is brilliant, in a strange sort of way. His mental powers are plainly demonstrated in his books, though most people do not bother to read far enough to recognize this due to the constant stream of invective that is to be found on nearly every page. And yet his cocky confidence attracts many people to his viewpoint." In Ruckman's words:

Ruckman once said that he would have joined the Ku Klux Klan had they not been anti-Semitic, because he agreed with "everything else they say".

Selected works 

 
  (translation)
 
  (Ruckman's autobiography)

References

External link

1921 births
Baptist ministers from the United States
Founders of new religious movements
King James Only movement
People from Pensacola, Florida
People from Wilmington, Delaware
People from Topeka, Kansas
Kansas State University alumni
University of Alabama alumni
Bob Jones University alumni
2016 deaths
Christian conspiracy theorists